Arthur Sydney Victor Smith  (22 January 18939 February 1971) was a senior Australian public servant. He was Secretary of the Department of Supply and Development from 1941 to 1942.

Life and career
Arthur Smith was born in Coburg, Melbourne on 22 January 1893.

Smith began his Commonwealth Public Service career in the Postmaster-General's Department when he was just 14.

Smith was appointed Secretary of the Department of Supply and Development in July 1941. In this role, he spent March to June 1942 in Washington, at first to secure greater collaboration between Australia, Britain and the United States in fighting the war in the Pacific. When the Pacific War Council was established, Smith was Australia's representative at council meetings.

When the Department of Supply and Development was abolished and the Department of Supply and Shipping was set up in its place, Smith became head of the new department.

Smith died in Darlinghurst, Sydney on 9 February 1971.

Awards
Smith was appointed a Commander of the Order of the British Empire in January 1951.

References

1893 births
1971 deaths
Australian public servants
Australian Commanders of the Order of the British Empire